Events from the year 1986 in Michigan.

Top Michigan news stories
The Associated Press (AP) selected the top stories in Michigan for 1986 as follows:

1. Heavy rains in September and October that brought 20 inches of rainfall and resulted in $400 million in damage, including $289 million in losses to farmers. Gov. Blanchard declared the flooding to be the worst in state history.
2. The November gubernatorial election in which James Blanchard won re-election with 68% of the vote.  Republican William Lucas, the first African-American candidate for the office, received 31% of the vote. The margin was the largest landslide in Michigan in six decades.
3. Incentives offered by General Motors and other American automobile manufacturers to reduce inventory. GM offered 2.9% financing, and American Motors offered zero percent loans on some models.
4. Record high water levels in the Great Lakes. Lake levels in October 1986 were more than a foot higher than the previous year.
5. The proposed conversion of Consumers Power's Midland Nuclear Power Plant to gas generation.
6. General Motors' announcement, following a $338 million operating loss in the third quarter, that it would close nine plants and scale back operations at two other plants. Seven of the affected plants were located in Michigan. The move was expected to result in the loss of 17,000 jobs in Michigan.
7. The decline in gasoline prices to 83 cents a gallon in Michigan.
8. The arraignment of Judge S. Jerome Bronson for bribery and his suicide hours later.
9. The application to the Department of Justice for a joint operating agreement between the state's two largest newspapers, The Detroit News and Detroit Free Press.
10. Michigan's unemployment rate drops below 10%.

The AP also separately suggested the state's top sports stories as follows:

1. The story of Chuck Long being drafted by the Detroit Lions, holding out for better contract terms, and missing most of the 1986 Detroit Lions season.
2. Kirk Gibson re-signing with the Detroit Tigers after becoming a free agent.
3. The Michigan Wolverines defeated Nebraska in the 1986 Fiesta Bowl, led by Jamie Morris who rushed for 156 yards in the game, and were ranked No. 2 in the final AP Poll.
4. The Detroit Red Wings' firing of Brad Park as head coach and hiring of Jacques Demers to replace him.
5. (tie) Jim Harbaugh guaranteeing a victory over Ohio State and leading the 1986 Michigan Wolverines football team to a berth in the Rose Bowl.
5. (tie) The demise of the Cherry Bowl, a bowl game played in the Pontiac Silverdome in 1984 and 1985.
7. The end of Scott Skiles' college basketball career. He led the 1985–86 Michigan State Spartans men's basketball team to the Sweet Sixteen round in the 1986 NCAA Division I men's basketball tournament.
8. The Michigan State Spartans men's ice hockey team winning the 1986 NCAA Division I Men's Ice Hockey Tournament.
9. (tie) The deaths of Detroit sports legends, Hank Greenberg (September 4), Norm Cash (October 11), and Bobby Layne (December 1).
10. The Detroit Pistons' trades that saw the departures of Kelly Tripucka and John Long and arrivals of Adrian Dantley and Sidney Green.

Office holders

State office holders

 Governor of Michigan: James Blanchard (Democrat)
 Lieutenant Governor of Michigan: Martha Griffiths (Democrat) 
 Michigan Attorney General: Frank J. Kelley (Democrat)
 Michigan Secretary of State: Richard H. Austin (Democrat)
 Speaker of the Michigan House of Representatives: Gary Owen (Democrat)
 Majority Leader of the Michigan Senate: John Engler (Republican)
 Chief Justice, Michigan Supreme Court:

Mayors of major cities
 Mayor of Detroit: Coleman Young
 Mayor of Grand Rapids: Gerald R. Helmholdt
 Mayor of Flint: James A. Sharp, Jr.
 Mayor of Lansing: Terry John McKane
 Mayor of Ann Arbor: Louis Belcher (Republican)/Edward C. Pierce (Democrat)

Federal office holders

 U.S. Senator from Michigan: Donald W. Riegle Jr. (Democrat)
 U.S. Senator from Michigan: Carl Levin (Democrat) 
 House District 1: John Conyers (Democrat)
 House District 2: Carl Pursell (Republican)
 House District 3: Howard Wolpe (Republican)
 House District 4: Mark D. Siljander (Republican)
 House District 5: Harold S. Sawyer (Republican)
 House District 6: Bob Carr (Democrat)
 House District 7: Dale Kildee (Democrat)
 House District 8: J. Bob Traxler (Democrat)
 House District 9: Guy Vander Jagt (Republican)
 House District 10: Bill Schuette (Republican)
 House District 11: Robert William Davis (Republican)
 House District 12: David Bonior (Democrat)
 House District 13: George Crockett Jr. (Democrat)
 House District 14: Dennis M. Hertel (Democrat)
 House District 15: William D. Ford (Democrat)
 House District 16: John Dingell (Democrat)
 House District 17: Sander Levin (Democrat)
 House District 18: William Broomfield (Republican)

Population

Sports

Baseball
 1986 Detroit Tigers season – Under manager Sparky Anderson, the Tigers compiled an 87-75 record and finished third in American League East. The team's statistical leaders included Alan Trammell with a .277 batting average, Darrell Evans with 29 home runs, Kirk Gibson with 86 RBIs, Jack Morris with 21 wins, and Mark Thurmond with a 1.92 earned run average.

American football
 1986 Detroit Lions season – Under head coach Darryl Rogers, the Lions compiled a 5-11 record and finished third in the NFC Central Division. The team's statistical leaders included Eric Hipple with 1,919 passing yards, James Jones with 903 rushing yards, Jeff Chadwick with 995 receiving yards, and Eddie Murray with 85 points scored.
 1986 Michigan Wolverines football team – Under head coach Bo Schembechler, the Wolverines compiled an 11–2 record and a berth in the 1987 Rose Bowl. The team's statistical leaders included Jim Harbaugh with 2,729 passing yards, Jamie Morris with 1,086 rushing yards, Ken Higgins with 621 receiving yards, and Mike Gillette with 59 points scored.

Basketball
 1985–86 Detroit Pistons season – Under head coach Chuck Daly, the Pistons compiled a 46-36 record and finished third in the NBA's Central Division. The team's statistical leaders included Kelly Tripucka with 1,622 points, Isaiah Thomas with 830 assists and Bill Laimbeer with 1,075 rebounds.

Ice hockey
 1985–86 Detroit Red Wings season – Under head coaches Harry Neale and Brad Park, the Red Wings compiled a 17-57-6 record and finished fifth in the NHL Norris Division. The team's statistical leaders included John Ogrodnick with 38 goals and 70 points and Kelly Kisio with 48 assists. The team's goaltenders were Greg Stefan (37 games), Mark LaForest (28 games), Eddie Mio (18 games), and Corrado Micalef (11 games).

Boxing

Other

Music and culture
 March 1986 - Anita Baker's album Rapture was released, sold 8 million copies, and won two Grammy Awards for Baker. The single "Sweet Love" reached No. 8 on the Billboard Hot 100.
 March 1986 - Ted Nugent's album Little Miss Dangerous was released.
 April 1986 - Bob Seger's album Like a Rock was released and reached No. 3 on the album chart. The single "Like a Rock" reached No. 1 on the US Billboard Mainstream Rock Tracks.
 June 1985 - Madonna's album True Blue was released and reached No. 1 on the album chart. The album included five hit singles, "Papa Don't Preach" (No. 1), "Open Your Heart" (No. 1), "Live to Tell" (No. 1), "True Blue" (No. 3), and "La Isla Bonita" (No. 4).
 September 1986 - Alice Cooper's album Constrictor was released.
 October 1986 - Iggy Pop's album Blah-Blah-Blah was released.

Chronology of events

January

February

March

April

May

June

July

August

September

October

November

December

Births

Gallery of 1986 births

Deaths
 June 12 - Murray Van Wagoner, 38th Governor of Michigan (1941-1943), at age 88 in Farmington Hills

Gallery of 1986 deaths

See also
 History of Michigan
 History of Detroit

References